Teniente Serrano was a torpedo boat destroyer commissioned by the Chilean Navy in 1896. It was built by Laird Brothers along with three other destroyers: Capitán Orella, Capitán Muñoz Gamero and Guardiamarina Riquelme (later Lientur).

They were steel-hulled torpedo boat destroyers with a turtleback forecastle and four funnels. These ships were, when built, the most advanced ships of their type in Latin America, closely related to contemporary British destroyers.

Teniente Serrano was launched at Laird's Birkenhead shipyard on 16 May 1896.

See also
  which served with Chilean Navy from 1928 to 1967
 Argentine–Chilean naval arms race
 List of decommissioned ships of the Chilean Navy

References

Lyon, Hugh. "Chile." In Conway's All the World's Fighting Ships 1860–1905, edited by Robert Gardiner, Roger Chesneau, and Eugene Kolesnik, 410–15. Annapolis, MD: Naval Institute Press, 1979. . .

External links
 Chilean Navy website, Destructor Serrano (1896)

Capitán Orella-class destroyers
1896 ships